Rangika Fernando (born 6 December 1988) is a Sri Lankan cricketer who played for the Sri Lanka women's cricket team. She made her Women's Twenty20 International cricket (WT20I) debut for Sri Lanka against England Women on 22 November 2010. She later became a coach, working with schools in Sri Lanka.

References

External links
 

1988 births
Living people
Sri Lankan women cricketers
Sri Lanka women Twenty20 International cricketers
Place of birth missing (living people)